Roseola vaccinia is a cutaneous condition characterized by a prominent rim of erythema surrounding the site of vaccinia injection.

See also 
 Vaccinia
 Skin lesion

References 

Virus-related cutaneous conditions
Vaccinia